Secret Diary is the debut studio album by American musician Girl Talk, released in 2002 on Illegal Art. The album was later made available for purchase through a "pay what you want" pricing system on Illegal Art's website.

Track listing
 "Let's Start This Party Right" – 2:26
 "I Want You Back" – 3:27
 "Ffun Haave To" – 5:12
 "What If..." – 4:22
 "Time to Get Glamorous" – 4:51
 "Unicorn vs. Gravity" – 2:16
 "The Right Stuff" – 5:48
 "Fun in the Sun" – 3:44
 "Jumpin(g)" – 3:23
 "Friends 4Ever"  – 4:14

References

External links
 Girl Talk on Illegal Art
 User-editable breakdown of samples and timings for Secret Diary

Girl Talk (musician) albums
2002 remix albums
Illegal Art albums